Naarda is a large genus of erebid moths currently encompassing 108 species. Initially identified by Francis Walker in 1866, it is in the family Erebidae. Somewhat ruddy in appearance, this genus is distinguishable for its generally slender thorax and abdomen,  and straight, porrect labial palpi. Most species are a light tan color, but shading can reach as deep as a charcoal, with muddy yellow, conspicuous reniform, orbicular stigmata featured on the forewings, sometimes reflected bilaterally superior. (Though these may be significantly more minute and successively annular.)

Physical features 
The wingspan is between 19-22mm, dependent on the species.

The rami of the antenna  are, at the maximum of its width, 9-10 times longer than the axis of the antenna, and the apical segments lack the rami. 

Aside from the elongated and easily recognizable porrect labial palpi of both sexes, (which are usually  5 times as long as the diameter of the eye, with the tertiary segment comparatively longer), and the relatively broad forewings with straight and even costa, substantial dissimilarity is present in the male sex.

Male
The most prominent autapomorphy is the uncus structure, which resembles the head of a long-billed bird. The uncus has a large, rounded subbasal dorsal bulb bearing a small, acute frontal spine and a large group of long hairs standing apart, (in the likeness of a forelock), and a long, straight, atypically dilated rounded distal section.

Other recurrent traits of the clasping apparatus across the entirety of the Naarda genus include the substantially broad tegumen; the well-developed and stout transtilla; and the variably broad, generally triangular valvae. The entire structure resembles a flying bird.

The phallus is short, straight, and thick; the vesica is inflated and basally broad. In most species, the ductus ejaculatoris is directed forward in the axis of the phallus. The cornutus is variably large, and its texture resembles that of a sponge cake.

Range
Of the 108 known species, virtually the entirety have been discovered in Asia, Southeast Asia, and Africa, but a handful are in the northern Australian region.

Countries where Naarda genus has been documented:

Species list

References

Further reading
 
 
 
 
 

Herminiinae
Moth genera
Erebid moths of Asia
Lepidoptera of Asia
Lepidoptera of Oceania
Lepidoptera of Africa